Spanaway Junior High is a public school in Spanaway, Washington, United States. Its enrollment was 768 as of June 2019. The school occupies a building built in 2007.

1985 shooting
On November 26, 1985, 14-year-old Heather Smith shot two boys fatally, including her boyfriend, then killed herself with a .22 caliber rifle at the school.

References

External links 
Spanaway Junior High School
Bethel School District

Schools in Pierce County, Washington
Public middle schools in Washington (state)